The 1912 VFL Grand Final was an Australian rules football game contested between the South Melbourne Football Club and Essendon Football Club, held at the Melbourne Cricket Ground in Melbourne on 28 September 1912. It was the 15th annual Grand Final of the Victorian Football League, staged to determine the premiers for the 1912 VFL season. The match, attended by 54,436 spectators, was won by Essendon by a margin of 14 points,  marking that club's third premiership victory and second in succession.

Teams

Statistics

Goalkickers

See also
 1912 VFL season

References

VFL/AFL Grand Finals
Grand
Essendon Football Club
Sydney Swans
September 1912 sports events